The electoral division of Franklin is one of the five electorates in the Tasmanian House of Assembly, located in southern Tasmania and includes Bruny Island, Kingston and the eastern shore of the Derwent River. Franklin is named after Sir John Franklin, the Arctic explorer who was Lieutenant-Governor of Van Diemen's Land (1837–43). The division shares its name and boundaries with the federal division of Franklin.

Franklin and the other House of Assembly electoral divisions are each represented by five members elected under the Hare-Clark electoral system.

History and electoral profile
Franklin includes most of the suburbs of Hobart, such as  Kingston, Seven Mile Beach and Lauderdale as well as the rural towns of Huonville, Franklin, Cygnet, Margate and Bruny Island. The subantarctic Macquarie Island is also part of the electorate. The division measures 6,911 km2.

Representation

Distribution of seats

Members for Franklin

See also

 Tasmanian Legislative Council

References

External links
Parliament of Tasmania
Tasmanian Electoral Commission - House of Assembly

Franklin
Franklin
Franklin